Toyota Gazoo Racing (TGR) is a motorsport division of the Japanese car manufacturer Toyota. It competes with and develops technologies for the GR sub-brand of Toyota's sports and performance-oriented production road cars.

Stylised by the manufacturer as TOYOTA GAZOO Racing, TGR compete most notably as the manufacturer's entries in FIA's World Rally Championship (as TGR WRT), World Endurance Championship and World Rally-Raid Championship. Toyota Gazoo Racing Europe is a research and development facility based in Cologne, Germany, with branches in the United Kingdom and Finland.

The GR-branded performance road cars include the GR Supra, the GR Yaris, the GR86, and the GR Corolla.



History 
In 2007, an in-house team consisting of student test drivers and mechanics led by Hiromu Naruse, who was a test driver of Toyota, competed in the 24 Hours Nürburgring race. Akio Toyoda, then the vice president of Toyota, who received driving instruction directly from Naruse, also participated as a driver. At that time, he was not allowed to call the team "Works Toyota Racing". Therefore, the name Team Gazoo was used instead. "Gazoo" (from ) is the name of a portal site that Toyota was involved in establishing. And in public relations, the drivers were also given the nicknames "Cap" for Naruse and "Morizo" for Toyoda. Also, as there were minimal budgets, they used the Altezzas and BMW E90s, which at the time had been discontinued, as the race car project. The Gazoo website posted the activity report as an amateur race project.

From 2009, the team continued to participate in the race by introducing development models such as the Lexus LF-A and the FT-86 with the goal of "training people and cars at the Nürburgring, the sacred place for new car development" under the Gazoo Racing name. The drivers include professional racers such as Takayuki Kinoshita, Akira Iida, and Hiroaki Ishiura, but the mechanics and engineers are selected from the employees. In 2014, the team had to play a three-class domination to honor Naruse's accidental death in June 2010.

After Toyoda taking office as the President of Toyota in 2009, the scope of Gazoo Racing has expanded, and it has organized several circuit events such as the "86/BRZ Race" and the "Toyota Gazoo Racing Festival", which is held every November. In addition, the sports conversion brands called "GRMN" (Gazoo Racing, tuned by the Meister of the Nürburgring) and "G's/G Sports" was established in 2009 and 2010 respectively.

From April 2015, all motorsports activities that had been divided into "Gazoo Racing", "Toyota Racing" and "Lexus Racing" have been unified with "Gazoo Racing". Toyota and Lexus brand racing activities are under the Gazoo Racing umbrella and are called "Toyota Gazoo Racing" and "Lexus Gazoo Racing". From this year onwards, Toyota Gazoo Racing (TGR) works machines use a common color scheme of red and black stripes on a white background. At the same time, the "Great Skills Training Department" has been set up to develop human resources who can participate in Gazoo Racing activities centered on rallies and Nürburgring.

In 2016, Juichi Wakisaka, who had retired from Super GT, became an ambassador for TGR. TGR also had acquired the naming rights for the first corner of the affiliated Fuji Speedway and renamed it to "TGR Corner". In addition, actor Takeru Satoh was appointed as a television advertisement character to carry out publicity activities.

In 2017, the Toyota Gazoo Racing Factory, which had been developing motorsport vehicles, was reorganized and the "Gazoo Racing Company" was established. As an in-house company, it strengthened its independence and contributed to Toyota's car making by feeding back the knowledge gained in the race to road cars, and the direction to secure profitability was decided. The sports conversion brand was reorganized into the GR series ("GRMN", "GR", "GR Sport/GR-S" and "GR Parts"), and the "GR Garage", which is a regional base, was set up at dealers in each region.

In 2019, the GR Supra, the first GR brand-exclusive car, was released. The GR Supra shares a platform with the BMW Z4 (G29) and is produced under contract by Magna Steyr in Austria.

In 2020, the GR Yaris, the second GR-branded car, and the first produced by Toyota, was launched. It is produced at the "GR Factory" inside the Motomachi plant, a production line dedicated to GR-branded vehicles. Unlike most automobile plants, the "GR Factory" does not use a conveyor belt assembly line, instead vehicles are built at stations with more manual assembly processes. The "GR Factory" employs experienced technicians recruited from throughout the company.

In 2021, the GR86, the third GR-branded car, was introduced. The vehicle is the second generation of the 86 sports car, which are jointly developed with Subaru, and produced Subaru's Gunma assembly plant.

In 2022, the GR Corolla, the fourth GR-branded car, and the second produced by Toyota, was unveiled. Built mainly for the North American market, the GR Corolla is produced at the "GR Factory" alongside the GR Yaris, which is not sold in North America.

Motorsport

FIA World Rally Championship 

The Toyota Gazoo Racing World Rally Team is based in Jyväskylä, Finland. The team was established and operated by an independent company, Tommi Mäkinen Racing, upon request of Toyota for their return to the championship in 2017. Toyota Gazoo Racing Europe GmbH later purchased Tommi Mäkinen Racing and its assets in 2020, bringing the team under the manufacturer's control.

The TGR WRT operated Toyota Yaris WRC cars between 2017 and 2021, winning the championship for manufacturers twice in 2018 and 2021, and the drivers and co-driver champion titles in 2019 for Ott Tänak and Martin Järveoja; and Sébastien Ogier and Julien Ingrassia in 2020 and 2021. Since 2022, the team has operated hybrid Toyota GR Yaris Rally1 cars, winning a third manufacturer's championship in the cars first year, along with the driver and co-driver championship titles for Kalle Rovanperä and Jonne Halttunen.

Former rally driver Jari-Matti Latvala is the team principal.

Sportscar Racing 

The Toyota Gazoo Racing entry in FIA World Endurance Championship is operated by Toyota Gazoo Racing Europe GmbH and is operated from the company's headquarters in Cologne, Germany. TGR Europe was formerly known as Toyota Motorsport GmbH (TMG) prior to 2016. Since then, and racing under the Toyota Gazoo Racing name, the team have won the World Endurance Championship four times, with wins at Le Mans three times with its LMP1 class Toyota TS050 Hybrid, and twice with the LMH Toyota GR010 Hybrid.

TGR Europe also enter the Nürburgring 24 Hours endurance race.

Rally-raid 
Entries in both the Dakar Rally and FIA World Rally-Raid Championship under the global TGR name are operated by Toyota Gazoo Racing South Africa, an alias for independent local company, Hallspeed. The company entered rally-raids at home and internationally under the direction of Toyota South Africa from 2012 until 2019 when Nasser Al-Attiyah and Mathieu Baumel won the car class outright. Since 2020, the entry has been under the 'global' Toyota Gazoo Racing name, with more support from the Toyota Motors parent company. TGR also won Dakar in 2022 and 2023, with the inaugural World Rally-Raid Championship title in 2022 also.

Lithuanian driver Benediktas Vanagas and Estonian co-driver Kuldar Sikk also compete internationally under the name of Toyota Gazoo Racing Baltics with support from the local Toyota dealer.

National 
In the UK, Speedworks Motorsport operate the British Touring Car Championship and British GT Championship entries of Toyota Gazoo Racing UK. In Argentina, Toyota Gazoo Racing Argentina enter various Argentine Championships.

Models 
Gazoo Racing is involved in the creation of vehicles in three categories. GR models are bespoke vehicles, GR Sport models are more entry-level conversions of existing models, and GRMN (Gazoo Racing, tuned by the Meister of the Nürburgring) models are the top-of-the-line, limited production conversions of existing models, including GR vehicles.

GR series

GR Sport (GR-S) series

GRMN series

Former production models 
 86 GR Sport (2018–2020, Japan only)
 86 GR (2018–2020, Japan only)
 Agya GR Sport (B100) (2021–2023, Indonesia only)
 Aqua GR Sport (NHP10) (2017–2021, Japan only)
 Avanza Veloz GR Limited (2021, Indonesia only)
 Harrier GR Sport (2017–2020, Japan only)
 Mark X GR Sport (2017–2019, Japan only)
 Noah/Voxy GR Sport (2017–2021, Japan only)
 Prius α GR Sport (2017–2021, Japan only)
 Prius PHV GR Sport (2017–2022, Japan only)
 Vitz GR Sport (2017–2020, Japan only)
 Vitz GR (2017–2020, Japan only)
 Yaris GR Sport (XP130) (2019–2020, Europe only)

Concept models 
 GR HV Sports Concept (2017)
 GR Super Sport Concept (2018)
 GR GT3 Concept (2022)
 bZ4X GR Sport Concept (2022)

See also 
 Toyota in motorsport
 Toyota Racing Development
 Toyota G Sports

References

External links 

  (global)

Toyota
Official motorsports and performance division of automakers
Auto parts suppliers of Japan
Dakar rally racing teams
2007 establishments in Japan
Super GT teams
Toyota in motorsport
Toyota subsidiaries